Areg is a common Armenian male name meaning "sun" in Armenian. See Wiktionary article on Areg for more. It is also said to have been the name of the God of the Sun in the Armenian Pantheon before the influence of Zoroastrianism and the Greek Pantheon.

Armenian masculine given names